Sax is a surname. Notable people with the surname include:

 Adolphe Sax, the inventor of the saxophone
 Cole Sax, American director
 Dave Sax, Major League Baseball player
 Emil Sax, Austrian economist
 Geoffrey Sax, sometimes credited as Geoff Sax, film and television director
 George D. Sax, business entrepreneur, drive-in bank innovator
 Gyula Sax, Hungarian chess player
 Joseph Sax, American environmental law scholars
 Leonard Sax, American psychologist and physician.
 Karl Sax, American botanist and geneticist
 Marjan Sax (born 1947), Dutch feminist lesbian activist
 Steve Sax, Major League Baseball player

See also
House of Sax
Saxe (surname)
Sachs
Sacks (surname)
Saks (surname)